S. Peter's Catholic Secondary School is located in Barrie, Ontario, Canada. It is a member of the Simcoe Musoka Catholic District School Board. The school is informally referred to as St. Pete's or St. Peter's. St. Peters was founded in 1996 and had an addition built on the west side of the school in 2010-2011 which consisted of six new classrooms, a new dance studio and fitness room, and a new student success center to accommodate the growing number of students. St. Peters also has a daycare/preschool attached to it. Six feeder schools contribute to the high school's population each year, these include but are not limited to: Holy Cross Catholic School, St. Francis of Assisi Catholic School, Saint Gabriel the Archangel Catholic School, St. John Paul II Catholic School, St John Vianney Catholic School, and St. Michael the Archangel Catholic School. The school's population is approximately 1150 students. The principal is Brad Shoreman and vice principals are Janet Cinnamon and Rose  Lafrance.

Although the school colours are gray and purple the uniforms are white, black, dark green, and gray. The uniforms include articles such as: polo shirts, vests, sweaters, cardigans, dress pants, walking shorts, capris, and gym apparel as well. Students are only allowed to wear plain black or white t-shirts or long sleeved shirts under their uniforms. Black jeans, yoga pants and or any other bottoms that are not school issued dress pants are not permitted. To avoid this problem St. Peters dress pants are fashioned with a yellow paw print sewn into the side of the right pant leg to help staff identify which students are wearing the proper pants.

Annual events include Monsignor Clair Cup, Halloween dress up day, Spirit week, Clash of Colours, PJ Day, Christmas assembly, Talent show, sears festival, locker clean-out, Ash Wednesday, Catholic Education Week, Ecuador Mission Trip, Film Festival, and Pride week. These events help to solidify a strong school community and help build teamwork skills as most of these events you participate as groups, teams, or grades.

Athletics
Fall sports:
Jr. & Sr. Girls Basketball
Jr. Football
Jr. Boys Hockey

Clubs
Anime Club
Panther Video Game Review Club
Chess Club
Prom Committee
Panther Athletic Council
Panther Student Union
Panther Fitness Club
Panthers for Justice
Avid Readers Club
Breakfast Program
Robotics Club
Auto Club
Tech Crew
Link Crew
Yearbook Committee
Photography Club
PSU Exec
Action Team/ (Spirit)
Dance Committee
Sales and Operations

See also
List of high schools in Ontario

References

External links
 Official Website

High schools in Barrie
Educational institutions established in 1996
1996 establishments in Ontario